KVAT may refer to:

 KVAT Food City, a supermarket chain headquartered in Abingdon, Virginia, United States
 KVAT-LD, a television station (channel 35, virtual 17) licensed to serve Austin, Texas, United States